Natalie Sandtorv (born 17 August 1988) is a Norwegian jazz musician (vocals, waterphone, harmonium, electronics) married July 29, 2016, to drummer Ole Mofjell, residing in Copenhagen, Denmark.

Biography 
Sandtorv was born in Ålesund, Norway. She studied jazz, improvisational music and electronics at the Norwegian Academy of Music in Oslo and at Griegakademiet in Bergen. She is known for her exploration of different expressions within improvisational music in solo projects and with various ensembles. Sandtorv started the band Polygon Junx in Bergen 2011, together with noise artist John Hegre.  and drummer Thore Warland from the band Staer. They combine their references from jazz, contemporary music, noise, rock and free improvisation, creating an unpredictable and unique sound, and in 2012 they played in Geneva (Switzerland), Landmark and Playdate (Bergen, Norway), Heck (Trondheim, Norway) and Blowout (Oslo, Norway). They also delivered a gig at Det Norske Studentersamfunn in Oslo featuring Marte Eberson and Kjetil Møster the same year.

In 2013 she went touring with Morning Has Occurred together with Karl Seglem, and also performed on tour with her boyfriend Ole Mofjell (drummer of Morning Has Occurred), playing three concerts in Kraków and Berlin, in addition to concerts in Norway. She also did a solo project for voice and electronics that was presented at Festspillene i Bergen, where she also presented a children's concert for the music festival. At the 2013 Julejazz in Ålesund, she collaborated with the brothers Christian Skår Winther and Andreas Skår Winther as a trio.

Sandtorv is most known as front singer of the band Morning Has Occurred including with Marte Eberson, touring in Europe (2014). They also joined the Vossajazz and JazzIntro competition,. They had received good reviews for performances at Norwegian jazz festivals like Midtsommejazz, Nattjazz, Vossajazz, Maijazz, Anjazz, and Balejazz.

Sandtorv bring the experimental concept of improvised meetings between innovative vocal artists and guitarists to a new extreme with the duo album The Jist with the inventive guitarist Torgeir Standal. They are keeping up the tradition of the master vocal artist Sidsel Endresen and highly inventive guitarist Stian Westerhus, but also inspired by the more experimental music of Maja Ratkje. In 2015 she released her first solo album Pieces Of Solitude.

She performed a duoproject in 2015 together with the British multi instrumentalist Steve Beresford at the Blow Out! festival in Oslo, Norway. Sandtorv is the initiator of the concert series Playdate in Bergen and Jugendjazz in Ålesund. In November 2015, she released her first solo album Pieces Of Solitude on the Va Fongool label.

Honors 
2016: Awarded Sparebank 1 Jazz Talent at the 2016 Moldejazz

Discography

Solo albums 
2015: Pieces Of Solitude (Va Fongool)
2017: Freedom Nation (Øra Fonogram), commission for Moldejazz

Collaborations 
With duo The Jist, including guitarist Torgeir Standal
2014: The Jist (Va Fongool)

With Morning Has Occurred
2014: Morning Has Occurred (Ocean Sound Recordings)

With Cokko
2016: The Dance Upon My Grave (Playdate Records)

With Not On The Guest List
2016: Free! Spirit! Chant! (Gaffer Records)

References

External links 

"Old Wind" Morning has Occurred - Vestnorsk jazzsenter on YouTube
Monitor: Morning Has Occurred og Karl Seglem on YouTube
Møt arrangøren bak «Jugendjazz» in Sunnmørsposten 
Se bildene fra Julejazz in Sunnmørsposten 

21st-century Norwegian singers
Norwegian women jazz singers
Norwegian jazz singers
Norwegian Academy of Music alumni
Grieg Academy alumni
University of Bergen alumni
Musicians from Ålesund
1988 births
Living people
21st-century Norwegian women singers
Morning Has Occurred members